The Amguema (O'mvaam; in its upper course Вульвывее́м, Vulvyveyem) is a stream located in Far East Siberia. It empties into the Chukchi Sea between Cape Schmidt and Cape Vankarem.

Geography

The river flows roughly from SW to NE across the Chukotka Mountains. It belongs to the Chukotka Autonomous Okrug administrative region of Russia. The Ekityki is the main, left-side tributary of the Amguema.

Upriver there is the small town of Amguema, where about 600 mostly Chukchi people live.

See also
 List of rivers of Russia

References

Rivers of Chukotka Autonomous Okrug
Drainage basins of the Chukchi Sea
Chukotka Mountains